Punch Drunks is a 1934 short subject directed by Lou Breslow starring American slapstick comedy team The Three Stooges (Moe Howard, Larry Fine and Jerry Howard). It is the second entry in the series released by Columbia Pictures starring the comedians, who released 190 short subjects for the studio between 1934 and 1959.

In 2002, Punch Drunks became the first and only Stooge film to be selected for preservation in the United States National Film Registry by the Library of Congress as being "culturally, historically, or aesthetically significant".

Plot
Moe, a struggling boxing manager, is having lunch with three of his fighters, who are threatening to quit in anger for not being paid. Upon hearing the song "Pop Goes the Weasel" being played by Larry on his violin, the timid waiter attending to the group, Curly, goes into a violent fugue state and knocks out all three fighters and the restaurant owner. Moe recruits Curly as a boxer and persuades Larry to play the tune ringside so Curly can easily defeat his opponents and win them prize money. Fighting under the name "K.O. Stradivarius," Curly quickly becomes the top contender for the heavyweight championship.

As Curly trains on a rural road under Moe's supervision, they notice a young lady whose car is stuck in a ditch. Moe tries to help her, urging Curly not to get involved, stating that boxing and women don't mix, but eventually asks Larry to play the tune to give Curly the strength to move the car. Curly rides away with the lady; on the night of the title bout, Moe finds them together in a dressing room and chastises Curly, telling him to avoid women and go to the arena.

Seconds into the first round, reigning champion Killer Kilduff knocks Curly out of the ring and onto Larry, breaking his violin. Larry frantically searches  the streets in search of anything that will play the song as Kilduff mercilessly pummels Curly. He finds a radio broadcasting the tune and hurries back to the arena with it. Though the music revitalizes Curly, it ends just as he is about to land a knockout punch, as a man's voice on the radio is about to tell a children's story involving Peter Rabbit, and the fight returns to Kilduff's favor. An infuriated Moe smashes the radio over Larry's head and sends him out to find something else they can use. Larry then commandeers a politician's campaign truck that is playing the tune, drives back to the arena, and crashes in through the wall. Curly is energized once again and easily knocks Kilduff out to win the championship, then accidentally knocks out Moe and Larry as the music keeps playing.

Cast
 Moe Howard as Moe
 Larry Fine as Larry
 Jerry Howard as Curly (K.O. Stradivarius)
 Chuck Callahan as Mr. McGurn
 Dutch Hendrian as spokesman mug
 Frank Moran as 3rd mug in restaurant (with cut over eye)
 Dorothy Granger as Curly's girlfriend
 Al Hill as Killer Kilduff
 William Irving as Killer Kilduff's fight manager
 Billy Bletcher as ring announcer
 Larry McGrath as referee
 Arthur Housman as timekeeper
 Harry Watson as gumball-throwing boy
 Jack "Tiny" Lipson as spectator seated next to Curly's girlfriend
 Charles King as man who falls off moving truck

Production and significance
The script for Punch Drunks was written by the Stooges, credited as "Jerry Howard, Larry Fine, and Moe Howard". According to Moe, the initial treatment of the script was originated by him; on its strength, the studio decided to produce the Stooges' next film sooner than scheduled. Filming was completed May 2–5, 1934.

In 2002, Punch Drunks was selected for preservation in the United States National Film Registry by the Library of Congress as being "culturally, historically, or aesthetically significant", the only Stooge film to achieve such an honor.

Notes

Punch Drunks was originally titled A Symphony of Punches, but was changed before its release. The title Punch Drunks comes from the expression "punch drunk", referring to any fighter who has been hit so many times he is unsteady on his feet. Punch Drunks was remade with Shemp Howard in 1945 as A Hit With a Miss. The plot device of gaining uncontrollable strength after hearing "Pop Goes the Weasel" was reworked with Joe DeRita in the Stooges' 1963 feature film The Three Stooges Go Around the World in a Daze.
A colorized version of this film was released in 2004 as part of the DVD collection Goofs on the Loose.
The short is notable as being one of the few in which the Stooges are not an established trio at the beginning of the film.
Curly's first "woo-woo-woo!", done when Larry first plays "Pop Goes the Weasel", ended up being reused as a stock overdub in several future Stooge shorts featuring Curly.
This is the first film in which Curly calls himself a "victim of soycumstance!" (circumstance): this comment would become one of Curly's catch-phrases.
When the Stooges are taking part in Curly's first workout as a boxer (rowing down the street), Larry is playing a tune on his violin that sounds akin to "Let's Fall in Love", a song sung 23 years later by the character Tiny (Muriel Landers) in the Stooge film Sweet and Hot. Larry plays the song before he loses his balance and falls, causing Moe to push him backwards, ending up in a shallow lake. Larry, who has hidden behind the door of the dressing room, suddenly appears, attempting to play a snippet of the same song, later on in the film for the young lady in the dressing room before Moe angrily uses a bucket of water to put on his head, to tell him to go upstairs to the arena.
Character actor Charles King, who played the man standing on the back of the truck, broke his leg during the fall.
The short ends with the playing of the song "Pop Goes the Weasel", which would become the opening theme for the short Pop Goes the Easel.
This is the first of several films in which a normally passive Curly sees, hears, or smells something that triggers a violent reaction from him. The idea would be reused in Horses' Collars, Grips, Grunts and Groans, and Tassels in the Air.
The boxing option in The Three Stooges video game is based on this short.
This was also the first of 9 shorts that featured Larry Fine playing his violin.
Over the course of their 24 years at Columbia Pictures, the Stooges were occasionally cast as separate characters, with this being one such occurrence (the boys start out in separate roles and end up working together).
During the fight, when Larry is seen running down the street, Curly's voice can be heard in the distance saying, "Run! All the way!" After a few seconds, he also says ‘Then come back!’ This happens twice in the film. This was a mistake in production and was left in.
As the referee is introducing challenger Curly, an audience member gestures obscenely at the camera.
Larry's running down the street is sped up for comic effect, with postproduction sounds of rapid footsteps added. His frantic driving of the van, with its speakers booming out "Pop Goes the Weasel" (the same recording as on the radio earlier), is also sped up.
This film features a rare scene in which Moe smacks someone other than one of his two pals; as several people begin to rub Curly down after a rather painful round of boxing and accidentally pull Moe into it, he slaps one of them in the back of the head.
The opening title music, "I Thought I Wanted You," composed by Archie Gottler (who directed the previous Stooge film, Woman Haters) and Edward Eliscu, is unique to this and next Stooge film, Men in Black.
 Originally, the song "Stars and Stripes Forever" was going to be used, but the producer did not want to pay royalties, so the song "Pop Goes the Weasel" was selected because it was in the public domain.
A snippet of Punch Drunks appears in the Eddie Murphy comedy Daddy Day Care.
The Stooges receive "story" credit for the short, with Curly credited under his real name; they did not actually write the script.  The story was submitted by Moe, and he added Larry and Curly's names in consideration of his partners.  The "screenplay" was written by Jack Cluett.
 One repeated gag occurs when Moe sees a young boy in the audience and asks for a piece of hard candy so that he could throw it at the bell, causing to ring and stop the fight, saving Curly by the bell. The kid repeatedly does the throwing, thus keeping Curly in the ring.

References

External links 
 
 
Punch Drunks at threestooges.net

1934 films
The Three Stooges films
United States National Film Registry films
1930s sports comedy films
American boxing films
American black-and-white films
Films directed by Lou Breslow
Columbia Pictures short films
American sports comedy films
1934 comedy films
1930s English-language films
1930s American films